Goodway may refer to:

Arts and entertainment

Mayor Goodway, a character in PAW Patrol

People

Andy Goodway (born 1961), British former professional rugby league footballer and coach 
Beverley Goodway (1943–2012), British photographer 
Cyril Goodway (1909–1991) was an English cricketer 
David Goodway (born 1942), British historian 
Martha Goodway is an American metallurgist, 
Russell Goodway (born 1955) is a Welsh Labour Party councillor and former Lord Mayor of Cardiff
Rita Goodway Mayor of Adventure Bay

Places

Goodway in Monroe County, Alabama, United States.

See also

English-language surnames